Appaloosa (2005) is a novel set in the American Old West written by Robert B. Parker. A film of the same name based on the novel was released in 2008.  Parker published a sequel, Resolution, in June 2008 and a third novel featuring the characters of Virgil Cole and Everett Hitch, Brimstone, in May 2009. A fourth and final book in the series—Blue-Eyed Devil—was published in 2010 shortly before Parker's death.

References

External links
 Appaloosa page from Parker's official site

2005 American novels
American novels adapted into films
Novels by Robert B. Parker